The year 1581 in science and technology included the following notable events.

Geophysics
 Robert Norman publishes his observations of magnetic dip in The Newe Attractive (London).

Medicine
 Roderigo Lopez becomes the physician-in-chief to Queen Elizabeth I of England until his death by execution, having been found guilty of plotting to poison her.

Births
 October 9 – Claude Gaspard Bachet de Méziriac, French mathematician (died 1638)
 Edmund Gunter, English mathematician (died 1626).
 approximate – Gaspare Aselli, Italian anatomist (died 1626).

Deaths
 Agatha Streicher, German physician (born 1520).

References

 
16th century in science
1580s in science